Willard Miller Huyck, Jr. (born September 8, 1945) is an American retired screenwriter, director and producer, best known for his association with George Lucas.

Career

Huyck and Lucas met as students at the film school of the University of Southern California, and became members of Francis Ford Coppola's American Zoetrope group of filmmakers. Along with his wife Gloria Katz, Huyck wrote screenplays for films including American Graffiti, Lucky Lady, Indiana Jones and the Temple of Doom, and Radioland Murders, and performed uncredited work on the original Star Wars.  He also directed four films he co-wrote with Gloria Katz: Messiah of Evil, French Postcards, Best Defense, and Howard the Duck. The latter film received universally negative reviews but in subsequent years has become a cult classic. Katz and Huyck also wrote and produced the NBC television films "A Father's Homecoming" and "American River." Willard Huyck is a current member of the Writers Guild of America and Directors Guild of America.

In addition to their work in the film industry, Katz and Huyck are well known as art collectors, having collected Indian miniature paintings beginning in the 1970s. This collection was sold at a Sotheby's auction in New York City in 2001. In subsequent years, they amassed a collection of Japanese photography that spanned from the late 1850s to the present. This collection was acquired in 2018 by the Smithsonian National Museum of Asian Art. The couple also wrote a photographic catalogue of the collection entitled "Views of India," designed and edited by Manfred Heiting and published by Steidl. Huyck is a member of the Getty Museum Photography Council.

Personal life
Huyck married Katz in 1969. They remained married until her death in 2018.  They have one daughter, Rebecca, born in 1983.

Filmography

Film

Other credits

Television

References

External links
 

1945 births
American male screenwriters
American film producers
Film directors from Minnesota
Living people
USC School of Cinematic Arts alumni